Ahí tienes a tu madre  is a 2004 Argentine film directed and written by Leandro Borrell.  The film starred Robert Ayambilla and Teresa Barceló.

Cast
Robert Ayambilla as Negro Manuel joven
Teresa Barceló as Ana de Matos
Alberto D'Angelo as Juan
Rubén De Virgilio as Bernabé González
Mirta Fissore Andrea as María
Mauro Gómez as Joaquín
Rubén Insaurralde as Don Felipe
Pablo Sosa as Negro Manuel viejo
Jorge Vilaltella as Padre Pedro Montalbo
Mario Zacarías as Maestro Oramas

Release and acclaim
The film premiered in March 2004 at the Mar del Plata Film Festival.

External links

See also
 Our Lady of Luján

Argentine drama films
2004 films
2000s Spanish-language films
2000s Argentine films